Plaesiorrhina is a genus of beetles belonging to the family Scarabaeidae, sometimes treated as a valid genus (e.g.) and sometimes as a subgenus within Chondrorrhina (e.g.).

List of species
 Plaesiorrhina cinctuta (Voet, 1779)
 Plaesiorrhina mediana (Westwood, 1843)
 Plaesiorrhina mhondana Oberthür, 1880
 Plaesiorrhina plana (Wiedemann, 1821)
 Plaesiorrhina watkinsiana Lewis, 1879

References 

 
Scarabaeidae genera